The San Leonardo in Treponzio is a Romanesque-style, Roman Catholic parish church, located along the road from neighborhood of Compito to the center of the town of Capannori in the province of Lucca, Tuscany, Italy.

History
The church was located alongside an Ancient Roman road. In 1105, a church and hospital were founded to attend pilgrims in route south. The layout is that of a Latin cross with a single nave and hemi-circular apse. The original bell-tower was razed, and replaced at the same site by a new tower in 1894. The facade has sculptural decoration attributed to followers of Guidetto.

References

Romanesque architecture in Tuscany
12th-century Roman Catholic church buildings in Italy
Churches in the province of Lucca